Alosa sphaerocephala, or the Agrakhan shad, is a species of clupeid (herring-like) fish, one of the endemic shad species in the Caspian Sea.

It spawns in shallow waters (about 3 m) of the northeastern part of the Caspian Sea, in salinities of 8-10 ppt. It does not enter fresh water. Spawning takes place in temperatures of 18-20 °C, from mid-May to end of June, and the young move southward relatively late in the autumn season.

Footnotes

References

sphaerocephala
Fish of the Caspian Sea
Taxa named by Lev Berg
Fish described in 1913